An inflation hedge is an investment intended to protect the investor against—hedge—a decrease in the purchasing power of money—inflation. There is no investment known to be a successful hedge in all inflationary environments, just as there is no asset class guaranteed to increase in value in non-inflationary times.

Overview
Inflation can impact investment decisions by making it difficult to predict future prices. This makes it risky to invest in certain assets, such as commodities, that may be impacted by inflation.

Inflation can erode the value of investments over time. This is why it is important for investors to consider inflation when making investment decisions.

Barron's Finance & Investment Handbook states: "Traditionally, gold and real estate have a reputation as good inflation hedges, though growth in stocks also can offset inflation in the long run. Money market funds, which pay higher yields as interest rates rise during inflation times, can also be a good inflation hedge."

Certain cryptocurrencies like Bitcoin are sometimes considered a modern "digital gold" and an alternative hedge against inflation to the more traditional gold, yet performed very poorly during the 2021–2022 inflation surge. 

Silver is also considered by some to be a hedge against inflation.

Platinum, once considered to be a more speculative metal for investors, has turned out in the 2020s to be a metal seen as a hedge against inflation similar or superior to gold, silver, or Bitcoin.

See also

Bitcoin
Gold
Goldbacks
Platinum
Inflation-indexed bond

References 

Asset
Inflation